Kim Clijsters was the defending champion, but lost to Victoria Azarenka in the quarterfinals.

Azarenka won her second title in Miami by beating Maria Sharapova in the final, 6–1, 6–4.

Seeds
All seeds received a bye into the second round.

Qualifying

Draw

Finals

Top half

Section 1

Section 2

Section 3

Section 4

Bottom half

Section 5

Section 6

Section 7

Section 8

External links
 WTA tournament draws
 ITF tournament draws

2011 WTA Tour
2011 Sony Ericsson Open
Women in Florida